Cherie Bambury (born 24 July 1976) is a former Australian cricket player. She played in the Women's National Cricket League for the Western Fury between 1996 and 2010. Bambury played fifteen One Day Internationals for the Australia national women's cricket team. Her final WODI appearance was in the final of the 2000 Women's Cricket World Cup.

References

External links
 Cherie Bambury at southernstars.org.au

Living people
1976 births
Australia women One Day International cricketers
Cricketers from Perth, Western Australia
Sportswomen from Western Australia
Western Australia women cricketers